Kimberly Huie is a Jamaican-born Canadian actress, best known for her lead roles in the television series Liberty Street and G-Spot.

Early life and education 
Born in Kingston, Jamaica, she moved to Toronto, Ontario with her family at age five. Her father, Barry Huie, was an engineer and book importer, a founder of the Kingston College alumni association, and the cousin of Jamaican painter Albert Huie. She began acting in high school, but completed a degree in history and political science at the University of Toronto before pursuing a professional career as an actress.

Career 
Huie's other acting credits have included appearances in the television series E.N.G., Forever Knight, Andromeda, Philly, Beautiful People, Studio 60 on the Sunset Strip, Chicago Hope, Grey's Anatomy, Self Made, Rookie Blue, The Parker Andersons and Amelia Parker, and the films Wishmaster: The Prophecy Fulfilled, Hairshirt, Never Get Outta the Boat, Deep Impact, and Passenger Side.

She has also acted on stage. Prior to Liberty Street, her most noted role was in Urban Donnellys, a stage show she cocreated with a theatre collective that included Marium Carvell, George Chiang, Sonia Dhillon, David Fox, Kanika Kapoor, Greg Kramer, Jack Nicholsen, Jovanni Sy and Michael Waller. In 2013, she appeared in a production of Robert Chafe's play As Ever in Nova Scotia.

Filmography

Film

Television

References

External links

Black Canadian actresses
Canadian television actresses
Canadian film actresses
Canadian stage actresses
Jamaican television actresses
Jamaican film actresses
Jamaican stage actresses
Jamaican emigrants to Canada
Actresses from Toronto
People from Kingston, Jamaica
University of Toronto alumni
Living people
Year of birth missing (living people)
20th-century Canadian actresses
21st-century Canadian actresses